Serration is a saw-like appearance or a row of sharp or tooth-like projections. A serrated cutting edge has many small points of contact with the material being cut. By having less contact area than a smooth blade or other edge, the applied pressure at each point of contact is greater and the points of contact are at a sharper angle to the material being cut. This causes a cutting action that involves many small splits in the surface of the material being cut, which cumulatively serve to cut the material along the line of the blade.

In nature, serration is commonly seen in the cutting edge on the teeth of some species, usually sharks. However, it also appears on non-cutting surfaces, for example in botany where a toothed leaf margin or other plant part, such as the edge of a carnation petal, is described as being serrated. A serrated leaf edge may reduce the force of wind and other natural elements. Probably the largest serrations on Earth occur on the skylines of mountains (the Spanish word sierra, as in Sierra Nevada, means a saw). These occur both due to the uneven action of landform edges pushing rock upwards, and the uneven action of erosion.

Human uses of serration have copied, and gone beyond, those found in nature. For example, the teeth on a saw or other serrated blade serves a similar cutting or scraping purpose as the serration of an animal tooth. Tailors use pinking shears to cut cloth with a serrated edge, which, somewhat counterintuitively, reduces fraying by reducing the average length of a thread that may be pulled from the edge. A type of serration is also found in airframe shapes used in certain stealth aircraft, which use the jaggedness of the serrated edge to deflect radar signals from seams and edges where a straight, non-serrated edge would reflect radar signals back to the source. Screw threads show serration in profile, although they are usually shown in abbreviated or symbolic fashion on mechanical drawings to save time and ink. Brogue shoes are made with serrated edges on the leather pieces, for no known purpose at all other than style. The step clamp and step block assembly in metalworking adopt serration for the purpose of applying clamping pressure from an adjustable position.

References

External links 

Cutting tools